Thomas Anselm Lorman is a historian who studies Central Europe.

Works

References

Historians of Hungary
Historians of Slovakia
Year of birth missing (living people)
Living people